The 1984 Yamaha International Masters was a non-ranking snooker tournament, that was held between 27 February to 4 March 1984 at the Assembly Rooms in Derby, England.
 


Main draw

Group 1

Group 2

Group 3

Group 4

Group 5

Group 6

Group 7

Group 8

Group 9

Semi-final group 1

Semi-final group 2

Semi-final group 3

Final Group

Qualifying

Group 1

Group 2

Group 3

Group 4

Group 5

Group 6

Group 7

Group 8

Group 9

Group 10

Group 11

Group 12

Group 13

Group 14

Group 15

Group 16

Group 17

Group 18

Group 19

References

British Open (snooker)
International Masters
International Masters
International Masters
International Masters